The Coupe des Champions (Tahiti Super Cup) is a match between the winner of the Tahiti Ligue 1 and the winner of the Tahiti Cup.

List of Winners

Performances

Performances by club

Top scorers

Hat-tricks

References
Tahiti - List of Coupe des Champions Winners, RSSSF.com

Football competitions in French Polynesia
National association football supercups
1995 establishments in Oceania
Recurring sporting events established in 1995
1995 establishments in France